Bryan Keith Cox Sr. (born February 17, 1968) is an American football coach and former player.  He is the assistant defensive line coach for the New York Giants of the National Football League (NFL).  He played college football for Western Illinois University, an FCS program that has developed other NFL talent, and received attention for his aggressive style of play.  Although Cox was a relatively late fifth-round pick by the Miami Dolphins in the 1991 NFL Draft, he rose to prominence as a standout linebacker during his twelve NFL seasons from 1991 through 2002.  He was a three-time pro bowler with the Miami Dolphins, and was also a member of the New England Patriots club that won Super Bowl XXXVI.

High school and college
Cox was a member of the East St. Louis High School Flyers high school football team, where he was coached by Bob Shannon.

Cox attended Western Illinois University and was a mass communications major and a letterman in football. In football, he was a four-year letterman and a two-year starter. As a senior, he was named as a first-team All-America selection by the Football Gazette and was a first-team all-conference selection. As a junior, he was named the Western Illinois Most Valuable Player. As a sophomore, Cox played in every game, and finished his sophomore season with 54 tackles, four forced fumbles, three fumble recoveries, two interceptions and three blocked kicks. As a freshman, Cox was a reserve nickel-back and finished the season with 30 tackles.

Professional playing career

Cox was drafted by the Dolphins in the fifth round of the 1991 NFL Draft, chosen 113th overall. As a rookie, Cox started 13 games as the Dolphins right outside linebacker, racking up a total of 61 tackles along with two sacks. Miami finished out the season 8-8. In his sophomore campaign, Cox blossomed and helped lead the Dolphins to an 11-5 record and the AFC Championship Game. He made his first Pro Bowl and was named to the All Pro team after recording 127 tackles, 14 sacks and five forced fumbles. Miami switched to a 4-3 defense in 1993 and Cox was moved to right linebacker. The team started out 9-2, but lost their last five to miss the playoffs. Cox again led the team with 122 tackles, four forced fumbles and four fumble recoveries. He also collected five sacks and an interception.

Cox earned his second Pro Bowl selection in 1994, starting 16 games at middle linebacker, leading the team with 100 tackles. Miami finished the season 10-6, winning the Wild Card Game against the Kansas City Chiefs, 27-17 before losing the Divisional Playoff to the San Diego Chargers, 22-21. In 1995, Cox was selected to his second consecutive Pro Bowl, and third overall. He again started every game at middle linebacker, finishing the year with a team high 119 tackles, 7.5 sacks and three forced fumbles. The Dolphins went 9-7 before bowing out in the Wild Card Game to the Buffalo Bills, 37-22. The defense tied for the AFC lead by allowing only seven rushing touchdowns. Overall, Cox spent five years with the Dolphins playing both outside and middle linebacker, starting 75 out of a possible 78 games. While with Miami, Cox made his distaste towards division rival Buffalo widely known, giving the finger towards fans in 1993 and getting into a fist-fight with Bills fullback Carwell Gardner in 1995.

Cox would go on to play seven more seasons in the NFL for the Chicago Bears,  New York Jets, New England Patriots, and New Orleans Saints. In a career encompassing 165 games, Cox recorded 764 tackles, tallied 51.5 quarterback sacks, caught four interceptions and forced 22 fumbles. Among his most famous plays was a 27-yard interception-return touchdown against the Patriots in September 1999 while playing with the Jets; another famous play came with the Patriots in September 2001 in a game against the Indianapolis Colts; Cox hit receiver Jerome Pathon in the first quarter, a hit that briefly knocked Pathon out.

Throughout his NFL career, Cox was easily recognizable on the field due to the unusual headrest- or "surfboard"-style neck roll he wore and colored to match his uniform jersey.

Post-playing career
From 2004 to 2005 he worked as an analyst for TVG Network. Cox also co-hosted an afternoon drive radio program for Fox Sports Radio in 2006 alongside Chris Myers.

Coaching Career
He was an assistant defensive line coach for the New York Jets for three seasons (2006–2008) under Eric Mangini. After Mangini was fired and became the coach of the Cleveland Browns in January 2009, he brought Cox with him, where Cox was the defensive line coach.

On February 21, 2011, Cox was hired by the Miami Dolphins as their pass rush coach.

On February 17, 2012, Cox was hired to become a defensive assistant at the Tampa Bay Buccaneers. He was hired the same day as Bill Sheridan.

On January 11, 2014, Cox was hired by the Atlanta Falcons as their defensive line coach.In the 2016 season, Cox and the Falcons reached Super Bowl LI on February 5, 2017. Against the New England Patriots, the Falcons would fall in a 34–28 overtime defeat.On February 8, 2017, the Atlanta Falcons relieved Cox of his duties as the defensive line coach.

On February 16, 2022, Cox joined the New York Giants as a defensive line assistant.

Personal life

Cox was born in East Saint Louis, Illinois to Ronald Cox and Nancy Mathis. He has five siblings, Christopher, Pamela, Anthony, Tonya and Junius Cox.

He is married to Kim Brown and  has five children  Bryan Cox Jr., Brittani Cox, Lavonda Cox, Chiquita Cox, and Kelli Cox.

Bryan's son, Bryan Cox Jr., played football as a defensive lineman for the Florida Gators and was a member of the Carolina Panthers practice squad, but got promoted to the active roster in late September of 2017. He signed with the Cleveland Browns on November 13, 2019. On April 29, 2020, he signed with the Buffalo Bills, who were ironically his father's most-hated rival.

Notes and references

1968 births
American Conference Pro Bowl players
American football linebackers
Atlanta Falcons coaches
Chicago Bears players
Cleveland Browns coaches
Living people
Miami Dolphins coaches
Miami Dolphins players
New England Patriots players
New Orleans Saints players
New York Jets coaches
New York Jets players
Players of American football from Illinois
Sportspeople from East St. Louis, Illinois
Tampa Bay Buccaneers coaches
Western Illinois Leathernecks football players
New York Giants coaches